Zsolt Kriston (born February 12, 1961) is a male former international table tennis player from Hungary.

He won a silver medal at the 1981 World Table Tennis Championships in the Swaythling Cup (men's team event) with Gábor Gergely, István Jónyer, Tibor Klampár and Tibor Kreisz for Hungary. Two years later he won a bronze medal at the 1983 World Table Tennis Championships in the Swaythling Cup (men's team event) with Gergely, Jónyer, Zoltán Káposztás and János Molnár.

He also won a European Table Tennis Championships gold medal in 1982, and competed in the men's doubles event at the 1988 Summer Olympics.

See also
 List of table tennis players
 List of World Table Tennis Championships medalists

References

1961 births
Living people
Hungarian male table tennis players
World Table Tennis Championships medalists
Olympic table tennis players of Hungary
Table tennis players at the 1988 Summer Olympics